Nauman Steele Scott (June 15, 1916 – September 19, 2001) was a United States district judge of the United States District Court for the Western District of Louisiana.

Education and career

Born in New Roads, Louisiana, Scott received a Bachelor of Arts degree from Amherst College in 1938. He received a Bachelor of Laws from Tulane University Law School in 1941. He was in private practice of law in Alexandria, Louisiana from 1941 to 1942. He was a United States Army Air Corps First Lieutenant from 1942 to 1946. He was in private practice of law in Alexandria from 1946 to 1970.

Federal judicial service

Scott was nominated by President Richard Nixon on September 14, 1970, to the United States District Court for the Western District of Louisiana, to a new seat created by 84 Stat. 294. He was confirmed by the United States Senate on October 13, 1970, and received his commission on October 15, 1970. He served as chief judge from 1976 to 1984. He assumed senior status on December 4, 1984. His service was terminated on September 19, 2001, due to his death in Alexandria.

References

Sources
FJC Bio

1916 births
2001 deaths
Louisiana lawyers
People from Alexandria, Louisiana
People from New Roads, Louisiana
Military personnel from Louisiana
Tulane University Law School alumni
Amherst College alumni
United States Army officers
United States Army personnel of World War II
Judges of the United States District Court for the Western District of Louisiana
United States district court judges appointed by Richard Nixon
20th-century American judges